A boil-water advisory, boil-water notice, boil-water warning, boil-water order, or boil order is a public-health advisory or directive issued by governmental or other health authorities to consumers when a community's drinking water is or could be contaminated by pathogens.

Under a boil-water advisory (BWA), the Centers for Disease Control and Prevention recommends that water be brought to a rolling boil for one minute before it is consumed in order to kill protozoa, bacteria, and viruses. At altitudes above , boiling should be extended to 3 minutes, as the lower boiling point at high altitudes requires more time to kill such organisms.

BWAs are typically issued when monitoring of water being served to consumers detects E. coli or other microbiological indicators of sewage contamination. Another reason for a BWA is a failure of distribution system integrity evidenced by a loss of system pressure. While loss of pressure does not necessarily mean the water has been contaminated, it does mean that pathogens may be able to enter the piped-water system and thus be carried to consumers. In the United States, this has been defined as a drop below .

History

John Snow's 1849 recommendation that water be "filtered and boiled before it is used" is one of the first practical applications of the germ theory of disease in the area of public health and is the antecedent to the modern boil water advisory. Snow demonstrated a clear understanding of germ theory in his writings. He first published his theory in an 1849 essay On the Mode of Communication of Cholera, in which he correctly suggested that the fecal-oral route was the mode of communication, and that the disease replicated itself in the lower intestines. Snow later went so far as to accurately propose in his 1855 edition of the work that the structure of cholera was that of a cell. Snow's ideas were not fully accepted until years after his death in 1858.

The first known modern boil-water advisory based solely on germ theory and unfettered by extraneous and irrelevant advice was distributed in 1866 during the last of three major cholera outbreaks that ravaged London in the 19th century.

See also
2010 Boston water emergency
1998 Sydney water crisis
Walkerton E. coli outbreak
Water supply
Water pollution

References

Drinking water
Health campaigns
Water treatment